Pop Crave, LLC. is a media and news company, founded by Will Cosme in December 2015. The company is primarily Twitter and Instagram-based but is backed by its website.

Overview 
Pop Crave offers music and celebrity news on an hourly basis, predominantly within the "stan" community. Unlike most web-based celebrity gossip outlets, Cosme posts short news snippets to Twitter and Instagram, providing a platform to fan communities, journalists, large entertainment outlets, and musicians. Cosme created a functional news site in order to expand his pop culture stories, highlight trending news, and provide exclusive celebrity interviews.

Pop Crave was one of the first news outlets to call the 2020 United States presidential election, after Decision Desk HQ.

Rolling Stone and Yahoo! Finance highlight Pop Crave for breaking down the genesis and importance of streaming numbers in the music industry.

References 

Social media companies of the United States
Twitter accounts
Instagram accounts
Companies established in 2015